Silvia Olari (born July 17, 1988) is an Italian pop, rock, soul and R&B singer. She made her debut under Warner Music after she participated in the famous Italian talent show Amici di Maria De Filippi in 2008.

Career

Early life
Silvia Olari was born in Parma on July 17, 1988 and lives in Fornovo di Taro, a little town near that city, with her parents. When she was only 8 years old she began to study classic piano under Jolanda Degli Innocenti at the music school Il Podio in Noceto (Parma). A year later, in the same school, under Daniela Galli she began to study modern singing. When she was 12 she took part in different provincial and regional events, getting great scores. When she was 14 she began to study lyric technique and singing, and continued for another year and half studying modern singing with her teacher Michela Ollari. In 2002 she changed direction in her musical career, combining together her singing and piano. When she was 17 she studied singing with Stefania Rava.

In 2002 she started to perform away from Parma and reached the semi-final of Festival di Napoli and Accademia di Sanremo. Between 2004 and 2006 she took part in important competitions in the north of Italy, coming first in Una voce per Sanremo in 2005, and again at the following year's Il Cantaestate in Mantova. In 2007 she won first prize at the City Voices in Nozza di Vestone (Brescia), and thanks to this event she attended the Luca Pitteri's singing stage. She took second place at Controfestival in Castelleone (Cremona), won the Publisher song section of 2005's Live Song Festival in Traversetolo (Parma) and in 2007 the critics' prize.

Amici di Maria De Filippi 2007
She progressed in the summer of 2007 through the casting stages of the Italian talent show Amici di Maria De Filippi, but at the first show on Canale 5, failed to be admitted.

In November 2007 she participated in the Marcafestival in Treviso, where she was placed third. In December she won the Festivalmare in Forte dei Marmi (Lucca), while in February she took part in the Festival di Ghedi, where she attended a stage with Gatto Panceri. At the end of the show she classified got second place with the song Georgia on my mind, and she won a scholarship for the Hope Music School of Rome.

Amici di Maria De Filippi 2008
On October 4, 2008, Silvia Olari again passed all the auditions for the talent show Amici di Maria De Filippi, and at her first public introduction was described as "a unique talent that no one can miss". From the first period on the show she had three songs included in the show's cd compilation album "Scialla". On January 4 she progressed to the next section of the show where all the participants challenged for first place. Unexpectately, Silvia was eliminated on February 18. Despite some critics of the show and one of the show's teacher, Luca Jurman, asking for her readmission, the other participants did not accept this, even though the public had previously expressed in her favour.

To the present
After her departure from the Amici di Maria De Filippi, she obtained a recording contract with Warner Music Italy, that had already expressed interest when she still was in the show. Her self-titled first album "Silvia Olari" was released on April 10, 2009. It contained 7 tracks, with two of them having been previously released on the "Scialla" compilation album. The first single from her album, Fino all'Anima, was written by Nek and arranged by Luca Jurman. Jurman also collaborated as musician and arranger for all the cd. In 2009, the debut album was certified silver by the Federation of the Italian Music Industry with sales of over fifteen thousand albums.

Discography

Albums

Singles

Compilations 
 2009 – Scialla (with other contestants of Amici)

Videography

References

External links
 Official Site Silvia Olari

1988 births
Living people
Italian pop singers
English-language singers from Italy
21st-century Italian singers
21st-century Italian women singers